Timothy James Walz (born April 6, 1964) is an American politician and retired educator. A member of the Democratic–Farmer–Labor Party (DFL), he has served as the 41st governor of Minnesota since 2019.

Born in West Point, Nebraska, Walz was a member of the Army National Guard, and worked in agriculture, manufacturing, and teaching after high school. He later graduated from Chadron State College and Minnesota State University, Mankato. He moved to Minnesota in 1996. Before running for Congress in 2006, he served for 24 years in the Army National Guard and as a social studies teacher in the Mankato school district. He was first elected in 2006, defeating six-term Republican incumbent Gil Gutknecht. He was reelected five times. Walz represented a large, mostly rural section of southern Minnesota situated along the border with Iowa.

On November 6, 2018, Walz was elected governor, defeating the Republican nominee, Hennepin County Commissioner Jeff Johnson. Walz was reelected in the 2022 Minnesota gubernatorial election, defeating Republican nominee Scott Jensen.

Early life, education, and early career 
Walz was born in West Point, Nebraska, the son of Darlene R. and James F. "Jim" Walz. The son of a public school administrator and community activist, Walz was raised in Chadron, Nebraska, a rural community in the northwestern portion of the state.

Walz graduated from Butte High School in a class of 25 students. In 1989, he earned a bachelor of science degree in social science education from Chadron State College. His first teaching experience was at the Pine Ridge Indian Reservation in South Dakota. He then accepted a teaching position with WorldTeach in the People's Republic of China. In 2001, he earned a Master of Science in educational leadership from Minnesota State University, Mankato.

Walz enlisted in the Army National Guard in 1981 and served for 24 years. Over his military career, he had postings in Arkansas, Texas, the Arctic Circle, New Ulm, Minnesota, and elsewhere. He worked in heavy artillery. During his career, he worked in disaster response postings following floods and tornados and was deployed overseas on active duty for months, although he never saw combat. In 1989, he earned the title of Nebraska Citizen-Soldier of the Year. Walz attained the rank of command sergeant major near the end of his career, but retired as a master sergeant in 2005 for benefit purposes because he did not complete coursework at the U.S. Army Sergeants Major Academy. He resumed teaching as a geography teacher and football coach at Mankato West High School.

Walz and his wife, Gwen, ran Educational Travel Adventures, accompanying high school juniors and seniors on summer educational trips to China.

U.S. House of Representatives

Elections 
Walz decided to run for Congress in 2006. He had no opponent for the DFL nomination in the September 12, 2006 primary election. He beat incumbent Republican Gil Gutknecht in the general election on November 7, and took office on January 3, 2007. After the election, Gutknecht was described as having been caught "off guard" and Walz as having "resolved never to get caught like that himself.... He packaged himself as a moderate from Day One, built an office centered on constituent service and carved out a niche as a tireless advocate for veterans."

Walz was reelected in 2008 with 62% of the vote, becoming only the second non-Republican to win a second full term in the district. He won a third term in 2010, defeating State Representative Randy Demmer with 50% of the vote. He was reelected in 2012, 2014, and 2016.

Tenure 

Upon his swearing in, Walz became the highest-ranking retired enlisted soldier ever to serve in Congress, as well as only the fourth Democrat/DFLer to represent his district. The others were Thomas Wilson (1887–1889), William Harries (1891–1893), and Tim Penny (1983–1995).

Walz served on the House Agriculture Committee, Committee on Veterans' Affairs, and the Armed Services Committee. Along with fellow Minnesota Democrat Keith Ellison, Walz opposed President Bush's plan to increase troop levels in Iraq. In his first week as a legislator, Walz cosponsored a bill to raise the minimum wage, voted for stem cell research, voted to allow Medicare to negotiate pharmaceutical prices, and voiced support for pay-as-you-go budget rules, requiring that new spending or tax changes not add to the federal deficit.

Even as he represented a district that had usually voted Republican, pundits described Walz's stated policy positions as ranging from moderate to liberal. He voted against the act to Prohibit Federally Funded Abortion Services, and to advance the Affordable Care Act out of the House. He also voted to continue funding for military operations in Iraq and Afghanistan, and against the 2008 TARP bill, which purchased troubled assets from financial institutions.

Walz received a 100% rating from Planned Parenthood in 2012, from the ACLU in 2011, from the American Immigration Lawyers Association in 2009–2010, from the AFL–CIO in 2010, from the Teamsters in 2009–2010, and from NOW in 2007. He also received single-digit ratings from the National Taxpayers' Union, Citizens against Government Waste, Americans for Tax Reform, and Freedom Works. The United States Chamber of Commerce gave him a 25% rating in 2010. Walz was ranked the 7th most bipartisan member of the House during the 114th Congress (and the most bipartisan member from Minnesota) in the Bipartisan Index created by The Lugar Center and the McCourt School of Public Policy that ranks members of Congress by measuring how often their bills attract co-sponsors from the opposite party and how often they co-sponsor bills by members of the opposite party.

Committee assignments 
 Committee on Agriculture
 Subcommittee on Conservation, Energy, and Forestry
 Subcommittee on General Farm Commodities and Risk Management
 Committee on Veterans' Affairs (Ranking Member)
 Subcommittee on Disability Assistance and Memorial Affairs
 Subcommittee on Economic Opportunity

Caucus memberships 
 Chair, Congressional EMS Caucus
 Co-Chair, National Guard and Reserve Component Caucus
 Co-Chair, Congressional Sportsmen's Caucus
 Co-Chair, Congressional Veterans Jobs Caucus
 Member, LGBT Equality Caucus
 Congressional Arts Caucus

Governor of Minnesota

Elections

2018

Walz announced he would run for governor after Mark Dayton, the incumbent Democratic governor, chose not to seek a third term. On November 6, 2018, Walz was elected governor, defeating the Republican nominee, Hennepin County Commissioner Jeff Johnson.

During the campaign, two senior NCOs of the Minnesota National Guard falsely accused Walz of fabricating facts about his service and lying about his military rank. The allegation about his military rank was debunked.

2022

Walz sought reelection in 2022. He won the August 9 Democratic primary and faced Republican nominee Scott Jensen in the November general election. On November 8, 2022, Walz defeated Jensen, 52.3% to 44.6%. Though Jensen fared better than Walz's opponent had in 2018 and made gains against Walz in Greater Minnesota, he did not overcome Walz's lead in the Minneapolis–Saint Paul metropolitan area.

Tenure

Walz was sworn in as governor of Minnesota on January 7, 2019, at the Fitzgerald Theater in Saint Paul. Walz took the oath of office alongside incoming Lieutenant Governor Peggy Flanagan, Minnesota Secretary of State Steve Simon, Minnesota State Auditor Julie Blaha, and Minnesota Attorney General Keith Ellison, all Democrats. Walz spoke about education and healthcare reform in his inauguration speech.

Police reform and protest response

On May 26, 2020, the day after the murder of George Floyd, Walz and lieutenant governor Peggy Flanagan demanded justice and called the video of Minneapolis police officer Derek Chauvin kneeling on George Floyd's neck "disturbing". Walz elaborated, "The lack of humanity in this disturbing video is sickening. We will get answers and seek justice".

Walz's initial response to the widespread protests following Floyd's murder was criticized by political opponents and other groups. He later responded to the murder by ordering the Minnesota legislature to reconvene for special sessions on legislation for police reform and accountability. After police reform failed to pass the first special session in June, a second special session was held in July. On July 21, the legislature passed major police reform legislation. The new compromise law includes a limited ban on police from using chokeholds so long as the officers are not at greater risk. It bans the old warrior training program, which was regarded as dehumanizing people and encouraging aggressive conduct. It requires training peace officers to deal with people with autism or in a mental health crisis and deescalation training for situations that could turn volatile. It also creates a special independent unit at the Bureau of Criminal Apprehension for investigations of fatal police encounters and a community relations advisory council to consult with the Police Officers Standards and Training Board on policy changes. Walz signed the legislation into law on July 23.

Political positions

Cannabis 
Walz has advocated for the legalization of recreational cannabis as governor of Minnesota. As a candidate for governor in 2017, he said: "We have an opportunity in Minnesota to replace the current failed policy with one that creates tax revenue, grows jobs, builds opportunities for Minnesotans, protects Minnesota kids, and trusts adults to make personal decisions based on their personal freedoms." In 2022, he proposed the creation of a Cannabis Management Office to develop and implement the "regulatory framework for adult-use cannabis" in Minnesota.

Economic issues 
During the economic crisis in 2008, Walz repeatedly spoke out against using taxpayer money to bail out financial institutions; in late September he voted against the $700 billion TARP bill, which purchased troubled assets from these institutions. Walz released a statement after the bill's passage, saying, "The bill we voted on today passes the buck when it comes to recouping the losses taxpayers might suffer. I also regret that this bill does not do enough to help average homeowners, or provide sufficient oversight of Wall Street." For the same reasons, in December 2008 he voted against the bill that offered $14 billion in government loans to bail out the country's large automobile manufacturers. In June 2009 Walz introduced a bipartisan resolution calling on the federal government to "relinquish its temporary ownership interests in the General Motors Corporation and Chrysler Group, LLC, as soon as possible" and stated that the government must not be involved in those companies' management decisions.

Despite his votes against bailout bills that loaned taxpayer money to large banks and auto manufacturers, Walz did vote with his Democratic colleagues to support the 2009 American Recovery & Reinvestment Act. As a member of the House Transportation Committee, Walz saw the stimulus bill as an opportunity to work "with his congressional colleagues to make job creation through investment in public infrastructure like roads, bridges and clean energy the cornerstone of the economic recovery plan". Walz has focused heavily on job and economic issues important to his southern Minnesota district, which has a mix of larger employers like the Mayo Clinic along with small businesses and agricultural interests. In July 2009 he voted for the Enhancing Small Business Research and Innovation Act, which he described as "part of our long-term economic blueprint to spur job creation by encouraging America's entrepreneurs to innovate toward breakthrough technological advancements".
Walz also urged assistance for hog and dairy farmers who struggled with lower prices for their commodities in 2008 and 2009.

Education 
Walz was a public school teacher for 20 years. He opposes using merit pay for teachers. Voting in favor of the American Recovery and Reinvestment Act, Walz pointed to its strong provisions in support of public school buildings. Walz is on record supporting legislation to lower tuition costs. In a February 12, 2009 speech, he said that the most important thing to do "to ensure a solid base for [America's] economic future … is to provide the best education possible for [American] children." He has received strong backing for these policies from many interest groups, including the National Education Association, the American Association of University Women and the National Association of Elementary School Principals.

Guns 
Walz is a strong supporter of gun rights and has been endorsed by the NRA multiple times.

LGBT rights 
Walz supports LGBT rights, including federal anti-discrimination laws on the basis of sexual orientation. In a 2009 speech he called for an end to the Don't Ask, Don't Tell policy. Walz voted in favor of the Matthew Shepard Hate Crimes Act and the Sexual Orientation Employment Nondiscrimination Act. In 2007, he received a 90% grade from the Human Rights Campaign, the nation's largest LGBT organization. In 2011, Walz announced his support for the Respect for Marriage Act.

Veterans' issues 
Having served 24 years in the Army National Guard, as a freshman in Congress he was given a rare third committee membership when he was assigned to the House Committee on Veterans' Affairs. Walz has championed enhanced veterans benefits since taking office in 2007. In May of that year the House unanimously passed his "Traumatic Brain Injuries Center Act" to set up five centers around the nation to study traumatic brain injuries and develop improved models for caring for veterans suffering from such injuries.

Walz also supported the GI Bill of 2008, which expanded education benefits for veterans and in some cases allowed them to transfer education benefits to family members. In 2009, Walz gave the keynote address at the American Legion National Convention in Louisville. He spoke about the need for the VA and Department of Defense to work together to make sure that returning service men and women "do not fall through the cracks when they transition to civilian life".

Walz was the lead House sponsor of the Clay Hunt Suicide Prevention for American Veterans Act, which directs the Veterans Administration to report on veteran mental health care and suicide prevention programs. It also gives the VA permission to provide incentives to psychiatrists who agree to join the VA medical system.

Women's issues 
Walz supports abortion rights and has a 100% rating from Planned Parenthood. The National Right to Life Committee gave him a rating of zero. In early 2009, Walz voted for the Lilly Ledbetter Fair Pay Act.

Personal life 
Walz and his wife Gwen married in 1994. They lived in Mankato, Minnesota, for nearly 20 years before moving to Saint Paul with their two children upon his election as governor.

Walz's brother Craig was killed by a falling tree during a storm in 2016. He was survived by his wife Julie, and their son Jacob, who suffered severe injuries but survived.

Walz is Lutheran.

Electoral history

See also 
 United States congressional delegations from Minnesota
 List of United States representatives from Minnesota

References

External links 

 Governor Tim Walz official government website
 Tim Walz for Governor campaign website
 
 

|-

|-

|-

|-

|-

1964 births
21st-century American politicians
American Lutherans
American people of German descent
American people of Irish descent
American people of Swedish descent
Chadron State College alumni
Democratic Party members of the United States House of Representatives from Minnesota
Democratic Party governors of Minnesota
Living people
Military personnel from Minnesota
Minnesota State University, Mankato alumni
Nebraska National Guard personnel
People from Chadron, Nebraska
People from West Point, Nebraska
Politicians from Mankato, Minnesota
United States Army soldiers